The bar-breasted honeyeater (Ramsayornis fasciatus) is a species of bird in the family Meliphagidae.
It is endemic to northern Australia, with a breeding season from late spring to winter. It feeds primarily on nectar and invertebrates.

References

bar-breasted honeyeater
Birds of the Northern Territory
Birds of Queensland
Endemic birds of Australia
bar-breasted honeyeater
Taxonomy articles created by Polbot
bar-breasted honeyeater